"Coconut Tree" is a song by Swedish-Congolese singer-songwriter Mohombi from his debut album MoveMeant, and featuring vocals from American singer Nicole Scherzinger. It was released on April 15, 2011 as a digital download in Sweden. The song was written by RedOne, AJ Junior, Mohombi, Bilal "The Chef", Jimmy Joker, Beatgeek and was produced by RedOne. It peaked to number 8 on the Swedish Singles Chart.

Music video
A music video to accompany the release of "Coconut Tree" was first released onto YouTube on May 31, 2011 and the video is directed by Director X.

Track listing 
Digital download
 "Coconut Tree" – 3:38

Chart performance

Weekly charts

Year-end charts

Certifications

Release history

References

2011 singles
Mohombi songs
Nicole Scherzinger songs
Male–female vocal duets
Song recordings produced by RedOne
Songs written by Mohombi
Songs written by RedOne
Songs written by AJ Junior
Songs written by Jimmy Thörnfeldt
Songs written by Bilal Hajji
2011 songs
Island Records singles
Songs containing the I–V-vi-IV progression